Sasang District is a gu in central Busan, South Korea. It has an area of 35.84 km2, and a population of about 275,000. Sasang-gu became a gu of Busan in 1995.

Administrative divisions

Sasang-gu is divided into 8 legal dong, which all together comprise 14 administrative dong, as follows:

Mora-dong (3 administrative dong)
Deokpo-dong (2 administrative dong)
Jurye-dong (3 administrative dong)
Samnak-dong
Gwaebeop-dong
Hakjang-dong
Eomgung-dong
Gamjeon-dong (2 administrative dong)

Sister cities
 Ganjingzi, China

See also
Geography of South Korea
Subdivisions of South Korea

References

External links

Sasang-gu website 

 
Districts of Busan